Borvayeh-ye Omeyr (also Romanized as Borvāyeh-ye ‘Omeyr and Borvāyeh-e ‘Omar) is a village in Elhayi Rural District, in the Central District of Ahvaz County, Khuzestan Province, Iran. At the 2006 census, its population was 584, in 109 families.

References 

Populated places in Ahvaz County